Triplophysa bleekeri is a species of stone loach in the genus Triplophysa. It is endemic to China. It grows to  TL. Having a wide distribution across the Qinghai-Tibet Plateau, it lives in fast-flowing rivers from 200 to 3,000m in altitude. Being an unusual species inhabiting high-altitude regions, it is an excellent model to investigate the genetic mechanisms of adaptation to the local environment. With this in mind a chromosomal-scale genome assembly was sequenced and assembled with a genome size of ∼628 Mb. This data finding that the Triplophysa genus likely diverged when the Qinghai-Tibet Plateau elevated by >4,000 m roughly 40 million years ago.

Etymology
Although the fish's patronym is not identified but it is clearly in honor of Pieter Bleeker (1819-1878), a Dutch medical doctor and ichthyologist.

References

B
Freshwater fish of China
Endemic fauna of China
Fish described in 1874
Taxa named by Henri Émile Sauvage
Taxa named by Claude Philibert Dabry de Thiersant